The Dutch Open Tennis Amersfoort (or Dutch Open) originally known as the Netherlands International Championships and Netherland Championships was a tennis tournament played on outdoor clay court and held in three different locations in The Netherlands between 1898 and 2008. From 1957 to 1973 the tournament consisted of both men's and women's events (singles, doubles, mixed doubles) but from 1975 onward only men's singles and doubles events were held.

History

The inaugural edition began on 23 August 1898 in the Hague the first champion of the event was Irish player Joshua Pim  awarded the title as a result of a walkover against American player William Howard until 1994 the tournament was played in multiple cities . It was part of the Grand Prix tennis circuit in the 1970s and an ATP Tour event from its inception in 1990. Amsterdam became the event host in 1995 and in 2002 the tournament moved to Amersfoort where it was held until its final edition in 2008.

In 2008 the organizers sold the right of organization to the family of Serbian tennis player Novak Djokovic, and the tournament was moved to Belgrade, where it became known as the Serbia Open.

Balázs Taróczy won six editions and is the record title holder.

Past finals

Men's singles

Women's singles

Mens Challenger singles

Mens Challenger doubles

References

External links
 Official website

 
Grand Prix tennis circuit
Tennis tournaments in the Netherlands
Clay court tennis tournaments
Recurring sporting events established in 1957
Recurring events disestablished in 2008
International sports competitions hosted by the Netherlands
1957 establishments in the Netherlands
2008 disestablishments in the Netherlands
Defunct tennis tournaments in Europe
Annual sporting events in the Netherlands
Defunct sports competitions in the Netherlands
Sports competitions in Amersfoort
Sports competitions in Amsterdam
Sports competitions in Hilversum